Kyjovice may refer to places in the Czech Republic:

Kyjovice (Opava District)
Kyjovice (Znojmo District)